Heather Erin Bown (born November 29, 1978) is a retired volleyball player from the United States, who played as a middle-blocker. She represented her native country at the 2004 Summer Olympics in Athens, Greece. There she finished in fifth place with the USA national team. She also competed at the 2000 Summer Olympics. Bown made her third straight Olympic appearance in Beijing, helping Team USA to a silver medal.

Early life and education 
Bown was born in Orange, California, and calls Yorba Linda, California home. She graduated from Esperanza High School in Anaheim where she was a three-year letterwinner. She was named all-CIF twice and played club volleyball for NIKE Ichiban that won the Junior Olympics in 1996.

Bown attended University of California, Santa Barbara, for two seasons, where her squad advanced the NCAA regional finals in 1997. In her sophomore campaign, she was named to the all-Big West first team after finishing the season ranked ninth nationally in hitting percentage (.384).

She transferred to the University of Hawaii in 1998 where she was named an American Volleyball Coaches Association First Team All-American and was the 1998 and 1999 WAC Player of the Year. In 1998, she ranked first in the WAC in hitting percentage (.389) and blocking (1.69) and led the team in kills in 24 matches. She had a career-high 30 kills vs. BYU-Hawaii. As a senior in 1999, she repeated as the WAC Player of the Year and repeated as an AVCA First Team All-American. In 1999, she led the nation with 2.25 block per game and posted 411 kills, 230 blocks and a .364 hitting percentage for the year.

Awards

Individuals 
 2001 NORCECA Championship "Best Spiker"
 2008–09 CEV Challenge Cup "Best Blocker"

Clubs 
 2008–09 CEV Challenge Cup –  Champion, with Monte Schiavo Banca Marche Jesi
 2011 Turkish Cup –  Champion, with Eczacıbaşı VitrA

References

External links 

 
 Dynamo Kazan player bio 
 

1978 births
Living people
American women's volleyball players
Volleyball players at the 2000 Summer Olympics
Volleyball players at the 2004 Summer Olympics
Volleyball players at the 2008 Summer Olympics
Olympic silver medalists for the United States in volleyball
UC Santa Barbara Gauchos women's volleyball players
Hawaii Rainbow Wahine volleyball players
Sportspeople from Orange, California
Medalists at the 2008 Summer Olympics
Middle blockers
American expatriate sportspeople in Italy
American expatriate sportspeople in Turkey
American expatriate sportspeople in Russia
Expatriate volleyball players in Italy
Expatriate volleyball players in Turkey
Expatriate volleyball players in Azerbaijan
American expatriate sportspeople in Azerbaijan
Expatriate volleyball players in Russia